Samara Joy McLendon (born November 11, 1999) is an American jazz singer. She released her self-titled debut album in 2021 and was subsequently named Best New Artist by JazzTimes. Her second album, Linger Awhile, was released in September 2022 and won the award for Best Jazz Vocal Album at the 2023 Grammy Awards, where she was also named Best New Artist. She was the second jazz musician to win the award.

Biography
A native of the Castle Hill neighborhood of the Bronx, New York City, Joy was born in 1999 into a musical family. Her paternal grandparents, Elder Goldwire and Ruth McLendon, were founders of Philadelphia gospel group The Savettes. Her grandfather, Elder Goldwire McLendon was also a finalist on season 3 of BET's Gospel Talent show, Sunday Best. Her father—a vocalist and bass player who has toured with gospel musician Andraé Crouch—introduced her to gospel greats such as The Clark Sisters, and soul and Motown music. She attended Fordham High School for the Arts and performed in its jazz band. During this time, she won Best Vocalist Essentially Ellington festival, a high school competition hosted by Jazz at Lincoln Center.

She first encountered jazz in a meaningful way when she enrolled in the jazz program at SUNY's Purchase College as a voice major, and was named an Ella Fitzgerald Scholar. Friends there introduced her to the great jazz vocalists including Sarah Vaughan and Fitzgerald, and such instrumentalists as Kenny Washington, Jon Faddis (with whom she studied), and Ingrid Jensen. 

In 2019, as Samara McLendon, she won the Sarah Vaughan International Jazz Vocal Competition. Working with producer and eventual manager Matt Pierson, she recorded her self-titled debut album while still in college, graduating magna cum laude in 2021. Samara Joy was released on July 9, 2021 on Whirlwind Recordings. Jazz Times named her Best New Artist for 2021. In February 2021, she was featured in Women of Color on Broadway, Inc.'s music video of "Summertime" from Porgy and Bess. In an interview, film director Regina King called her "a young woman who seems like Sarah Vaughan and Ella Fitzgerald are both living in her body."

She released a number of viral video performances, including one that had been viewed more than 1.5 million times as of October 2020. These videos had as of November 2022 gained her 200,000 followers on TikTok. Partly on the strength of this success, she toured Europe, including a series of sold-out concerts in Italy and Austria. In 2021 and continuing into 2022 she toured the U.S., including bookings at the 2022 Monterey Jazz Festival, Lincoln Center Summer For The City's Jazz Underground series, Winter Jazzfest, and other festivals, as well as in Europe.

On February 15, 2022, she performed on Today with guitarist Pasquale Grasso and performed again on Today in September 2022. On June 15, 2022, she was featured at Carnegie Hall's 16th Annual Notable Occasion. and appeared at the Newport Jazz Festival. She was featured on jazz pianist Julius Rodriguez's 2022 album Let Sound Tell All. 

On September 16, 2022, she released her second album, Linger Awhile, on Verve Records. The album features drummer Kenny Washington, guitarist Pasquale Grasso, pianist Ben Paterson, and bassist David Wong. Her bookings for Winter 2022 included singing with the Jazz at Lincoln Center Orchestra on its Big Band Holidays tour.

She was nominated and won two awards at the Grammy Awards in 2023: Best Jazz Vocal Album for Linger Awhile and Best New Artist, making her the second jazz singer to win the award, the first being Esperanza Spalding in 2011.

Discography

As lead artist

As featured artist

Awards and honors

References

External links
 

1999 births
Living people
21st-century American singers
21st-century American women singers
African-American women singers
American jazz singers
American women jazz singers
Grammy Award winners
Musicians from the Bronx
Verve Records artists
Whirlwind Recordings artists